Indykpol is one of the largest poultry processors and the largest turkey processor in Poland. It is headquartered in Olsztyn. The company was founded in 1991 as the private successor of the state-owned corporation Olsztyńskie Zakłady Drobiarskie. In 1993, it was transformed into a joint-stock company. Since October 12, 1994, it has been listed on the Warsaw Stock Exchange.

References 

Food and drink companies established in 1991
1991 establishments in Poland
Food and drink companies of Poland
Companies listed on the Warsaw Stock Exchange
Polish brands
Olsztyn